Fraser is a location on the Klondike Highway in northwestern British Columbia, Canada.

Description
The community has no businesses or permanent residents aside from employees of a Canada Border Services Agency port of entry located there, along with a Yukon territorial government highway maintenance camp and a privately owned micro-hydro project that provides power. Housing in the area is rented out for customs employees and highway workers. Telephone and internet service is provided from the Carcross, Yukon telephone exchange and thus carries the area code 867. The locality's name is pronounced   by locals and Yukoners, but Skagwegians pronounce it   (like the television sitcom Frasier).

History
Historically, Fraser is a railroad station on the White Pass and Yukon Route railway; unimportant for many years since conversion to diesel locomotives. Currently, the railway uses Fraser for a terminus of tourist train operations, where passengers can transfer between buses and trains. Railroad rehabilitation works to the north are sometimes staged from Fraser.

See also
 List of communities in British Columbia

External links

Unincorporated settlements in British Columbia
Klondike Gold Rush
Atlin District